Olson House  may refer to:

Places and structures

United States

Charles A. and Mary Olson House, Sand Point, Idaho, listed on the National Register of Historic Places (NRHP) in Bonner County
Olson House (South Cushing, Maine), site of Andrew Wyeth's "Christina's World", NRHP-listed
Oscar Olson House, Braham, Minnesota, listed on the NRHP in Isanti County
Floyd B. Olson House, Minneapolis, Minnesota, NRHP-listed
Charles and Fae Olson House, Gresham, Oregon, NRHP-listed
August Olson House, Portland, Oregon, NRHP-listed
Nicolai–Cake–Olson House, Portland, Oregon, NRHP-listed
Lewis Olson Log House, Mission Hill, South Dakota, listed on the NRHP in Yankton County
Olson-Hanson Farm, Clifton, Texas, listed on the NRHP in Bosque County
Olson-Nelson Farm, Clifton, Texas, listed on the NRHP in Bosque County
Joseph and Anna Olson Farm, Clifton, Texas, listed on the NRHP in Bosque County
Erick Lehi and Ingrid Larsen Olson House, River Heights, Utah, listed on the NRHP in Cache County
Louis and Ellen Olson House, Enumclaw, Washington, NRHP-listed
Mary Olson Farm, Kent, Washington, listed on the NRHP in King County

See also
Olsen House (disambiguation)